Ginie Lim Siew Lin (林秀凌) is a Malaysian woman politician. Ginie Lim is a member of People's Justice Party (PKR), a component party of Pakatan Harapan (PH) coalition.

Lim served as a one-term Member of the Malacca State Legislative Assembly (MLA) for Machap Jaya from May 2018 to November 2021 and during which she also appointed a Malacca State Executive Council (EXCO) member as Chairman of the Women, Welfare and Rural Development from 2018 until the 2020 political crisis.

Lim was a progressive student leader during her years in Universiti Sains Malaysia. After graduated, she held National Secretary position in Malaysian Youth and Student Democratic Movement (DEMA) and Secretary of Solidariti Mahasiswa Malaysia (SMM) before she joined PKR in 2005. Lim, who is trilingual in Malay, Chinese and English, served as media coordinator under the party's Information Bureau.

Lim first participated in the 2008 Malaysian general election as one of the youngest women candidates at age 27 years old. She stood in Machap (former name of Machap Jaya), her mother's hometown where she grew up. She lost by 1,639 votes to the MCA candidate but she stood again in 2013 and lost by 152 votes. 

In her third attempt in 2018, after consistent groundwork over 10 years in rural area, Lim made a breakthrough in Machap Jaya for the first time and won against the former Alor Gajah Parliamentarian and MCA leader Koh Nai Kwang with 1,336 votes.

Before being elected, Lim worked as a Researcher in the party's think tank Institut Rakyat. She then joined the office of Selangor's Menteri Besar Azmin Ali as Media and Research Officer. 

Lim is currently the Chief of Alor Gajah Division and Central Committee Member of the party's Women Wing. Previously she was the Youth and Women Chief of PKR Malacca, and Deputy Chief of National Information Bureau.

Lim has worked on women empowerment, gender inclusivity, sustainable development, and enhancement of Orang Asli and special needs children.

Lim was dropped from Machap Jaya candidacy for the 2021 Malacca state election. The decision was received with some protest from grassroots party members. Lim continued to campaign for Pakatan Harapan in the state election.

Election results

Honours

Honours of Malaysia
  :
  Companion Class I of the Order of Malacca (DMSM) – Datuk (2019)

References

External links
 

1981 births
Living people
People from Malacca
Malaysian people of Chinese descent
People's Justice Party (Malaysia) politicians
Members of the Malacca State Legislative Assembly
Malacca state executive councillors
21st-century Malaysian politicians